Artist Descending a Staircase is a radio play by Tom Stoppard, first broadcast by the BBC in 1972, and later adapted for live theatre. The play centres on a murder mystery involving an artist who dies from falling down a set of stairs. The play is a humorous exploration of the meaning and purpose of art. The title alludes to Marcel Duchamp's 1912 painting Nude Descending a Staircase, No. 2.

Plot
The play opens with the sound of the artist, Donner, falling down the stairs. The other two roommates, Martello and Beauchamp, enter and find him at the bottom of the staircase. Beauchamp, an artist whose focus is on the sounds of daily life, examines a recording of the sounds of Donner's fall. The pair decides that a murderer must have awakened Donner from his sleep and then pushed him down the stairs to his death. Martello and Beauchamp accuse each other of the crime. The following scenes flash back to  several different years at least 50 years in the past. This part of the play follows the three artists and their interactions with a blind woman named Sophie. The end of the play returns to the present. Martello and Beauchamp are unable to solve the mystery.

Original production 
The play was originally broadcast on BBC Radio 3 on 14 November 1972. It is now available on the BBC CD Tom Stoppard Radio Plays.

In January 2016, BBC Radio 3 revived the play with a cast that included Derek Jacobi, Ian McDiarmid, Geoffrey Whitehead and Pippa Nixon.

Theatrical production
A stage adaptation, written by Stoppard, was first performed at the Kings Head, Islington, London in 1988, which later transferred to The Duke of York's Theatre, London. It featured the following cast:

 Peter Copley – Beauchamp
 Gareth Tudor Price – Young Beauchamp
 William Lucas – Martello
 Karl James – Young Martello
 Frank Middlemas – Donner
 John Warnaby – Young Donner
 Sarah Woodward – Sophie  

Directed by Tim Luscombe.

Subsequently performed at R.J. Reynolds Theatre, on the Duke University campus, in 1989. 

It was followed by a Broadway production, at the Helen Hayes Theater. It featured the following cast:
Michael Cumpsty – Young Beauchamp
Jim Fyfe – Young Martello
Harold Gould – Beauchamp
John McMartin – Donner
Stephanie Roth – Sophie
Paxton Whitehead – Martello
Michael Winther – Young Donner

The play was re-staged in December 2009, for the first time in twenty years, at the Old Red Lion Theatre in Islington, London, with the following cast:
Jeremy Child – Beauchamp
Olivia Darnley – Sophie
Ryan Gage – Young Martello
Max Irons – Young Donner
Edward Petherbridge – Donner
Alex Robertson – Young Beauchamp
David Weston – Martello

In 2022 the play returned to the King's Head with the original cast's three young artists taking the roles of their older counterparts. It featured the following cast:
 Karl James - Martello 
 Gareth Tudor Price - Beauchamp
 John Warnaby - Donner
 Nicholas Armfield - Young Martello 
 Benjamin Prudence - Young Beauchamp
 Barnaby Tobias - Young Donner
 Francesca Eldred - Sophie
 Stage Directions realised by Rosalind Lailey

References

1972 plays
Plays by Tom Stoppard